Thor Søndergaard Lange (born 4 August 1993) is a professional footballer who plays as a defender for Stabæk. He holds both Danish and Norwegian citizenship.

Career
Born in Denmark, Lange grew up in Norway. He joined the academy of Stabæk at the age of 7. On 6 April 2013, he made his senior debut for the club. He spent the 2014 and 2015 seasons on loan at Strømmen, before making the move permanent in early 2016. In July 2018, he transferred to Danish 1st Division club Fremad Amager. In August 2020, he joined Horsens, where he made six appearances in the Danish Superliga. On 14 March 2022, he signed a two-year contract with Stabæk, returning to the club where he started his career.

References

External links

1993 births
Living people
Sportspeople from Bærum
Association football defenders
Danish men's footballers
Norwegian footballers
Stabæk Fotball players
Strømmen IF players
Fremad Amager players
AC Horsens players
Norwegian First Division players
Danish 1st Division players
Danish Superliga players